Stoberry Lodge is a grade II listed house in Dury Road, Monken Hadley. The house dates from around 1830.

References

External links

Grade II listed buildings in the London Borough of Barnet
Houses in the London Borough of Barnet
Monken Hadley